Guy Dubois (born January 14, 1950 in Switzerland) is a former Swiss ice hockey player who played for the Switzerland men's national ice hockey team at the 1972 and 1976 Olympics.

External links

Guy Dubois statistics at Sports-Reference.com

1950 births
Swiss ice hockey forwards
Olympic ice hockey players of Switzerland
Living people
HC La Chaux-de-Fonds players
Ice hockey players at the 1972 Winter Olympics
Ice hockey players at the 1976 Winter Olympics